Amtady  is a village in the southern state of Karnataka, India. It is located in the Bantwal taluk of Dakshina Kannada district in Karnataka.

The people in the village are peace loving people .It has many famous religious places. There are Churches, Mosques and Temples. People here speak Tulu, Konkani and Beary language. People are mostly dependent on agriculture and animal husbandry. Paddy, Arecanut, Coconut are the main crops grown here.

Demographics
 India census, Amtady had a population of 5387 with 2547 males and 2840 females.

Nearby villages
Eliyanadu godu
Kukkipady
Rayee
Arala
Panjikal
Kodi
Koila
Chennaithodi
Ajjibettu
Kudambettu
Pilimogru

Religious places 
Our Lady of Loretto Church, Loretto 
Church of St. John Marie Vianney, Bambil
Badria Juma Masjid, Tippu Nagar
Annappa Swamy Temple
Mahamaya Temple

Education 
DKZP Govt. Higher Primary School, Kinnibettu
DKZP Govt. Higher Primary School, Nalkemar
Lotetto aided higher Primary School, Loretto 
Loretto English Medium High School, Loretto
Loretto English Medium Lower Primary School, Loretto

See also
 Dakshina Kannada
 Districts of Karnataka

References

External links
 ದಕ್ಷಿಣ ಕನ್ನಡ ಜಿಲ್ಲೆ, ಮಂಗಳೂರು, ಕರ್ನಾಟಕ

Villages in Dakshina Kannada district